Koksilah River Provincial Park is a provincial park in British Columbia, Canada.

Location
Koksilah River Park is located 4 km west of Shawnigan Lake on southern Vancouver Island.

Activities
The park offers hiking, fishing, swimming, picnicking, scenic views, and mountain biking. The park is officially only open for day use activities although many people camp here in the summer months. This is a popular spot for motorcycles.

Burnt Bridge
A gated metal bridge runs over the Koksilah River. It is called Burnt Bridge because the original (built in 1865) was destroyed in a forest fire. Burnt Bridge has been rebuilt twice. Also crossing the Koksilah River is the Kinsol Trestle, just east of the park.

References

External links

Provincial parks of British Columbia
Cowichan Valley
Year of establishment missing